Kattalai may refer to:
 Kattalai Amman Temple
 Kattalai (film)
 Kattalai, India, village in Tamil Nadu